Chaudhry Nadeem Abbas Rebaira (born 16 December 1970) is a Pakistani politician who has been a member of the National Assembly of Pakistan since August 2018. Previously he was a member of the National Assembly from June 2013 to May 2018 and a member of the Provincial Assembly of the Punjab from 2008 to 2013.

Early life and education
Abbas was born on 16 December 1970 in Okara. He received a Bachelor of Arts degree in 2005 from the University of the Punjab.

Political career

Abbas served as Tehsil Nazim of Okara. He ran for the seat of the Provincial Assembly of the Punjab as an independent candidate from Constituency PP-153 (Okara-I) in 1997 Pakistani general election but was unsuccessful. He received 15,488 votes and lost the seat to Syed Ghulam Mohi-ud-Din Shah, a candidate of Pakistan Muslim League (N) (PML-N).

He was elected to the Provincial Assembly of the Punjab as a candidate of Pakistan Muslim League (Q) (PML-Q) from Constituency PP-189 (Okara-V) in 2008 Pakistani general election. He received 33,298 votes and defeated Rao Khalid Khan, a candidate of Pakistan Peoples Party (PPP).

He was elected to the National Assembly of Pakistan as a candidate of PML-N from Constituency NA-143 (Okara-I) in 2013 Pakistani general election. He received 90,652 votes and defeated  Rai Muhammad Aslam Kharal, a candidate of PML-Q.

In October 2017, he was appointed as Federal Parliamentary Secretary for information technology and telecommunication. He was re-elected to the National Assembly as a candidate of PML-N from Constituency NA-141 (Okara-I) in 2018 Pakistani general election.

References

Living people
Pakistan Muslim League (N) politicians
Punjabi people
Pakistani MNAs 2013–2018
1970 births
People from Okara, Pakistan
Punjab MPAs 2008–2013
Pakistani MNAs 2018–2023